Miliollata is a class wherein Foraminifera is regarded as a phylum that unites the porcelaneous Miliolida, (subclass Miliolana Saidova, 1981) and siliceous Rzehakinidae (subclass Miliamminana Mikhalevich, 1980) based on similarities of their tests. Previously the Rzehakinidae were included in the Textulariina (Loeblich and Tappan, 1964) based on test wall composition rather than test form. The meaning of Miliolida is retained.

The Miliolana are variable in form. All are porceleneous and iperphorate, some incorporating foreign material; some are attached, others free.  Includes the Milliolidae which have two tubular chambers per whorl, the multichambered Sorititdae and the mostly prolate Alveolinidae. The Rzehakinidae (Miliamminana) resemble the Miliolidae in overall form but differ in composition.

References

 Miliolta-Foraminifera in Morphological classification of Foraminerfera (V.I. Mikhalevich et al.)
 Alfred R. Loeblich Jr and Helen Tappan, 1964. Sarcodina Chiefly "Thecamoebians" and Foraminiferida; Treatise on Invertebrate Paleontology, Part C Protista 2. Geological Society of America and University of Kansas Press.

Foraminifera classes